Sokolye is a rural locality (a settlement) in Danilovskoye Rural Settlement, Melenkovsky District, Vladimir Oblast, Russia. The population was 140 as of 2010. There are 3 streets.

Geography 
Sokolye is located 14 km southwest of Melenki (the district's administrative centre) by road. Melenki is the nearest rural locality.

References 

Rural localities in Melenkovsky District